Maharaja Nandakumar Mahavidyalaya, established in 2007 is a government aided degree college in Nandakumar, Purba Medinipore, West Bengal, India. With more than 14 subjects of study, it offers a vibrant and engaging environment to learn and grow through education and various other activities. It is affiliated to Vidyasagar University, Midnapore, West Bengal, India.

Departments
 Bengali
 Education
 English
 History
 Music
 Physical Education
 Political Science
 Sanskrit
 Anthropology
 Electronics
 Environmental Science
 Geography
 Mathematics
 Nutrition
 Physics

History 
Maharaja Nandakumar, the political acumen and great martyr of 18th Century Bengal, was the Faujdar of Hooghly and Zamindar (Land-owner) of Basudevpur Mouza, now known as Nandakumar in the district of Purba Medinipur which he got as a gift for his help as a revenue officer to Maharani of Tamluk during her troubled times.

Being born in a noble Brahmin family in 1705 at Bhadrapur, Birbhum he was educated in Sanskrit and Arabic, but soon joined as a revenue officer like his father Padnava Roy under East India Company. As a robust personality his firmness and resoluteness confirmed the evil eye of East India Company, particularly Lord Warren Hastings, the then Governor General of Bengal for not supporting misdeeds for his personal gain using the chief post of east India company, As a result , he was mooted as a victim of a forgery case of a deed of one Bulaki Das and ultimately he was accused by the law of the British in place of the Country law particularly when the East India Company was not the supreme ruler of the Country. As justice was denied without allowing a chance of self-defense, he was sentenced to death and was hanged by the British on 5 August 1775, at Cooli Bazar, Kolkata. The tragedy of his death has remained still like a ballad in the mind of the people of Bengal.

To commemorate his death and as a long historical legacy of region, the newly found college has been named after him as “MAHARAJA NANDAKUMAR MAHAVIDYALAYA”. It is situated at the centre of the police station of Nandakumar and surrounded by a high academic environmental zone initially with the support and auspices of ICARE, Haldia, to cater humanistic and scientific knowledge and to uphold the holistic approach to the people of local community in order to generate growth and prosperity of this region as a whole. The local representative of the Legislative Assembly also took initiative for the establishment of this degree college. Kalyan Sebashram Sangha, a pioneer and benevolent organization extended its support with a donation of 5.33 acre of valuable land. Finally, the approval from the Higher Education Department, Government of W.B. and the affiliation from Vidyasagar University, Medinipur, made the foundation of this Mahavidyalaya into reality on the auspicious day, the 6th August, 2007.

Though the college in its infant stage was temporarily running in a building of District Child Welfare Department, it was shifted to its own Campus on 2 January 2015, at Bhabanipur, Kalyanchak. It is now situated by the side of Digha-Howrah High Road, only two kilometer away from NH-41 Crossing. Hon’ble M.P, Tamluk Parliamentary Constituency and Chairman of Haldia Development of Authority, Sri Suvendu Adhikary is gracious enough to allot grants into two phases of Rs. 2.20 Crore for the construction of the present building. At present it has become one of the leading burgeoning colleges under Vidyasagar University. Now the college has been included under Sections 2F and 12B of UGC Act.

The college also has a unit of Netaji Subhas Open University which offers 7(Seven) PG course programmes. The process to get NAAC accreditation towards an all-round improvement of the college has been undertaken since then in collaboration with the IQAC, formed in 2016, and other stakeholders who have been working relentlessly to maintain the internal quality of teaching - learning and academic excellence.

See also

References

External links
Maharaja Nandakumar Mahavidyalaya
Vidyasagar University
University Grants Commission
National Assessment and Accreditation Council

Colleges affiliated to Vidyasagar University
Educational institutions established in 2007
Universities and colleges in Purba Medinipur district
2007 establishments in West Bengal